Arthur Chevrolet, (April 25, 1884 – April 16, 1946) was a Swiss racecar driver and automobile manufacturer.

Biography
Born in Bonfol, Canton of Jura, Switzerland, Arthur was the middle brother of Louis Chevrolet (1878–1941), founder of the Chevrolet car company; and Gaston Chevrolet (1892–1920). After brother Louis immigrated to America and earned enough money, he sent for Gaston and Arthur to join him. Once there, Arthur worked as an automotive mechanic and joined his brothers in auto racing. In 1911, he competed in the inaugural Indianapolis 500 but had to drop out after 30 laps when his Buick developed mechanical problems.

In 1916, the year after older brother Louis left the Chevrolet car company that he had co-founded, Arthur Chevrolet  assisted Louis and Gaston in the new Frontenac Motor Corporation.

Driving a Frontenac, Arthur qualified for the Indianapolis 500 again in 1916, but was forced out after 35 laps when the car developed ignition magneto problems. His driving career ended during practice rounds for the 1920 Indianapolis 500 when he was severely injured in a crash. Brother Gaston won that year's race in a Frontenac, but Gaston was killed in a California race a few months later.

In 1928, Arthur filed with the US Patent Office for an 'Overhead Valve Engine'.  Patent #1,744,526 was awarded on January 21, 1930.

In 1929 Arthur and Louis Chevrolet left the auto business altogether to form the Chevrolet Brothers Aircraft Company with a new engine of their design (Chevrolair).  The business was unsuccessful and was eventually taken over by investors. Arthur and Louis returned to automobiles, becoming pioneer leaders in the development of sprint type race cars. In 1990 Arthur and his brother were inducted to the inaugural class of the National Sprint Car Hall of Fame & Museum.

In 1942 Arthur Chevrolet retired to Slidell, Louisiana. Suffering from depression, he committed suicide by hanging in 1946, only nine days shy of his 62nd birthday.

Arthur Chevrolet has long been thought to be interred next to his brothers in the Holy Cross and Saint Joseph Cemetery in Indianapolis, Indiana. A headstone was placed at the grave in 2011 to memorialize his life by the Indianapolis Motor Speedway on the 100th anniversary of the founding of the Chevrolet Motor Company. The St. Tammany News  (which ceased operations in early 2013) revealed in a series of articles in late August 2012 that Arthur was not buried in Holy Cross and St. Joseph Cemetery as previously believed but is most likely in a lost and unmarked grave in Our Lady of Lourdes Cemetery in the city where he died, Slidell, Louisiana. The grave thought to be that of Arthur Chevrolet for many years is in fact his son, Arthur Chevrolet Jr. who died at 23 years old in November 1931, 15 years prior to Arthur Sr. death.

Indy 500 results

See also 
 Travel Air Type R Mystery Ship

References

External links 
 Arthur Chevrolet at ChevroletBrothers.com

1884 births
1946 suicides
People from La Chaux-de-Fonds
American people of Swiss-French descent
Swiss emigrants to the United States
Indianapolis 500 drivers
National Sprint Car Hall of Fame inductees
Suicides by hanging in Louisiana
Burials at Holy Cross and Saint Joseph Cemetery
People from Slidell, Louisiana
20th-century American businesspeople
Businesspeople from Louisiana
Racing drivers from Louisiana
Automotive businesspeople
1946 deaths